John Laurie (1797 – 2 August 1864) was a British Conservative politician.

Laurie was first elected Conservative MP for Barnstaple at a by-election in 1854—caused by the constituency's result at the 1852 general election being declared void on petition due to bribery, leading to the writ for the seat also being suspended in 1853. However, Laurie's term was short-lived after, upon petition, he was unseated in March 1855, due to bribery. He later regained the seat in 1857 and held it until 1859 when he did not seek re-election.

References

External links
 

1797 births
1864 deaths
UK MPs 1852–1857
UK MPs 1857–1859
Conservative Party (UK) MPs for English constituencies
Members of the Parliament of the United Kingdom for Barnstaple